Ian Silberman (born October 10, 1992) is a former American football guard. A 2009 USA Today High School All-American out of Fleming Island High School, Silberman enrolled at Florida, where he appeared in 20 games with seven starts, before transferring to Boston College after his graduation. Silberman was selected by the San Francisco 49ers in the sixth round of the 2015 NFL Draft. He has also been a member of the New England Patriots, Indianapolis Colts, Cleveland Browns, Oakland Raiders, Carolina Panthers, and New York Guardians.

High school career 
A native of Orange Park, Florida, Silberman attended Fleming Island High School, where he played offensive tackle and also saw limited action at defensive end. As a junior, Silberman earned All-Area and All-Clay County honors and was named to the 4A All-State Second-team. The Golden Eagles finished 8–2 on the season, yet missed the playoffs because of lopsided district losses to Orange Park and Gainesville Buchholz late in the season. In his senior year, Silberman helped to lead Fleming Island to a 10–2 season record. The Golden Eagles advanced to the FHSAA Class 5A Regional finals, where they lost to Lakeland High School. Silberman was named Second-team USA Today High School All-American after the season, and also participated in the 2010 Under Armour All-American Game at Tropicana Field in St. Petersburg.

Regarded as a four-star recruit by Rivals.com, Silberman was ranked as the No. 10 offensive tackle prospect of the class of 2010, which was highlighted by Seantrel Henderson. He chose Florida over offers from Auburn, Louisiana State, and Southern California.

College career 
After redshirting his initial year at Florida, Silberman saw limited action during his redshirt freshman season, appearing on the Gators' offensive line in only three non-conference games. In his sophomore year, Silberman played in eight games while starting three. As a junior, he started four games of out of a total of eight he appeared in.

Having graduated from Florida in December 2013 with a bachelor's degree in Family, Youth and Community Science, Silberman decided to use his final year of eligibility at another institution. He was set to transfer to Louisville, but reversed his decision after head coach Charlie Strong left for the Texas Longhorns. Instead, he and quarterback Tyler Murphy decided to enroll at Boston College. Silberman started all 13 games at right tackle for the Eagles, competing in 896 plays (98.1 percent of the team's offensive snaps), as dual-threat quarterback Murphy broke the ACC single-season record for rushing yards by a quarterback (1,184). After the season, Silberman earned All-ACC third-team honors voted by the league’s head coaches.

Professional career

San Francisco 49ers
Silberman was selected by the San Francisco 49ers in the sixth round (190th overall) in the 2015 NFL Draft. On August 27, 2016, Silberman was released by the 49ers.

New England Patriots
On September 15, 2016, Silberman was signed to the Patriots' practice squad. He was released on September 28, 2016. He was re-signed to the practice squad on October 11, 2016. He was released on October 18, 2016.

Oakland Raiders
On October 21, Silberman was signed to the Oakland Raiders' practice squad. He signed a reserve/future contract with the Raiders on January 9, 2017. He was waived on September 2, 2017.

Indianapolis Colts
Silberman was claimed off waivers by the Indianapolis Colts on September 3, 2017. He was waived by the Colts on September 22, 2017 and was re-signed to the practice squad. He was released on November 21, 2017.

Cleveland Browns
On December 13, 2017, Silberman was signed to the Cleveland Browns' practice squad.

Oakland Raiders (second stint)
On December 22, 2017, Silberman was signed by the Raiders off the Browns' practice squad. He was waived on September 2, 2018.

Tennessee Titans
On September 25, 2018, Silberman was signed to the Tennessee Titans' practice squad.

Oakland Raiders (third stint)
On October 3, 2018, Silberman was signed by the Raiders off the Titans' practice squad. On December 3, he was released.

Carolina Panthers
On December 6, 2018, Silberman was signed to the Carolina Panthers practice squad. He signed a reserve/future contract with the Panthers on December 31, 2018. He was waived on July 24, 2019.

Indianapolis Colts (second stint)
On July 30, 2019, Silberman was signed by the Indianapolis Colts. He was released with a non-football illness designation on August 10, 2019.

Arizona Cardinals
On November 13, 2019, Silberman was signed to the Arizona Cardinals practice squad, but was released six days later.

New York Guardians
Silberman signed with the New York Guardians of the XFL in December 2019. He had his contract terminated when the league suspended operations on April 10, 2020.

References

External links 
 
 San Francisco 49ers bio
 Boston College Eagles bio

1992 births
Living people
People from Orange Park, Florida
Players of American football from Florida
American football offensive guards
Florida Gators football players
Boston College Eagles football players
San Francisco 49ers players
New England Patriots players
Oakland Raiders players
Indianapolis Colts players
Cleveland Browns players
Tennessee Titans players
Carolina Panthers players
Arizona Cardinals players
New York Guardians players